This is a list of mammals of Victoria, Australia:

 Acrobates pygmaeus (feathertail glider)
 Aepyprymnus rufescens (rufous rat-kangaroo)
 Antechinus agilis (agile antechinus)
 Antechinus flavipes (yellow-footed antechinus)
 Antechinus minimus (swamp antechinus)
 Antechinus swainsonii (dusky antechinus)
 Arctocephalus pusillus (Cape fur seal)
Arctophoca forsteri (New Zealand fur seal)
 Arctophoca tropicalis (subantarctic fur seal)
Austronomus australis (white-striped freetail bat)
 Axis axis (axis deer) introduced
Axis porcinus (Indian hog deer)
 Balaenoptera acutorostrata (minke whale)
 Balaenoptera edeni (Bryde's whale)
 Balaenoptera musculus (blue whale)
 Balaenoptera physalus (fin whale)
 Bettongia gaimardi (eastern bettong)
 Bettongia penicillata (woylie)
 Burramys parvus (mountain pygmy possum)
 Canis familiaris dingo (dingo)
 Caperea marginata (pygmy right whale)
 Cercartetus concinnus (southwestern pygmy possum)
 Cercartetus lepidus (Tasmanian pygmy possum)
 Cercartetus nanus (eastern pygmy possum)
 Chalinolobus gouldii (Gould's wattled bat)
 Chalinolobus morio (chocolate wattled bat)
 Chaeropus ecaudatus (pig-footed bandicoot) extinct
 Conilurus albipes (white-footed rabbit-rat) extinct
 Dama dama (common fallow deer) introduced
Dasyurus maculatus (tiger quoll)
 Dasyurus geoffroii (western quoll)
 Dasyurus viverrinus (eastern quoll) reintroduced
 Delphinus delphis (short-beaked common dolphin)
 Eubalaena australis (southern right whale)
 Falsistrellus tasmaniensis (eastern false pipistrelle)
 Globicephala melas (long-finned pilot whale)
 Grampus griseus (Risso's dolphin)
 Gymnobelideus leadbeateri (Leadbeater's possum)
 Hydromys chrysogaster (water rat)
 Hydrurga leptonyx (leopard seal)
 Hyperoodon planifrons (bottlenose whale)
 Isoodon obesulus (southern brown bandicoot)
 Kogia breviceps (pygmy sperm whale)
 Lagenodelphis hosei (Fraser's dolphin)
 Lagorchestes leporides (eastern hare-wallaby) extinct
 Lepus europaeus (European hare) introduced
 Leporillus apicalis (lesser stick rat)
 Lobodon carcinophaga (crabeater seal)
 Macropus fuliginosus (western grey kangaroo)
 Macropus giganteus (eastern grey kangaroo)
 Macrotis lagotis (greater bilby)
 Mastacomys fuscus (broad-toothed mouse)
 Megaptera novaeangliae (humpback whale)
 Mesoplodon bowdoini (Andrews' beaked whale)
 Mesoplodon densirostris (Blainville's beaked whale)
 Mesoplodon ginkgodens (ginkgo-toothed beaked whale)
 Mesoplodon grayi (Gray's beaked whale)
 Mesoplodon layardii (Layard's beaked whale)
 Mesoplodon mirus (True's beaked whale)
 Miniopterus schreibersii (common bentwing bat)
 Mirounga leonina (southern elephant seal)
 Mormopterus planiceps (southern free-tailed bat)
 Mus musculus (house mouse) introduced
 Myotis adversus (large-footed bat)
Myotis macropus (southern myotis)
 Neophoca cinerea (Australian sea lion)
 Ningaui yvonneae (southern ningaui)
 Notamacropus greyi (toolache wallaby) extinct
 Notamacropus rufogriseus (red-necked wallaby)
 Notomys mitchellii (Mitchell's hopping mouse)
 Nyctophilus geoffroyi (lesser long-eared bat)
 Nyctophilus gouldi (Gould's long-eared bat)
 Nyctophilus timoriensis (greater long-eared bat)
 Onychogalea fraenata (bridled nail-tail wallaby)
 Orcinus orca (orca)
 Ornithorhynchus anatinus (platypus)
 Oryctolagus cuniculus (European rabbit) introduced
 Osphranter robustus (eastern wallaroo)
 Osphranter rufus (red kangaroo)
 Perameles bougainville (western barred bandicoot)
 Perameles gunnii (eastern barred bandicoot)
 Perameles nasuta (long-nosed bandicoot)
 Petauroides volans (greater glider)
 Petaurus australis (yellow-bellied glider)
 Petaurus notatus (Krefft's glider)
 Petaurus norfolcensis (squirrel glider)
 Petrogale penicillata (brush-tailed rock-wallaby)
 Phascogale calura (red-tailed phascogale)
 Phascogale tapoatafa (brush-tailed phascogale)
 Phascolarctos cinereus (koala)
 Physeter macrocephalus (sperm whale)
 Planigale gilesi (paucident planigale)
 Potorous longipes (long-footed potoroo)
 Potorous tridactylus (long-nosed potoroo)
 Pseudocheirus peregrinus (common ringtail possum)
 Pseudomys apodemoides (silky mouse)
 Pseudomys australis (plains rat)
 Pseudomys bolami (Bolam's mouse)
 Pseudomys desertor (brown desert mouse)
 Pseudomys fumeus (smoky mouse)
 Pseudomys gouldii (Gould's mouse)
 Pseudomys novaehollandiae (New Holland mouse)
 Pseudomys shortridgei (heath mouse)
 Pseudorca crassidens (false killer whale)
 Pteropus poliocephalus (grey-headed flying-fox)
 Pteropus scapulatus (little red flying-fox)
 Rattus fuscipes (bush rat)
 Rattus lutreolus (Australian swamp rat)
 Rattus norvegicus (brown rat) introduced
 Rattus rattus (black rat) introduced
 Rhinolophus megaphyllus (smaller horseshoe bat)
 Rusa timorensis (Javan rusa) introduced
 Saccolaimus flaviventris (yellow-bellied pouched bat)
 Scotorepens balstoni (western broad-nosed bat)
 Scotorepens orion (eastern broad-nosed bat)
 Sminthopsis crassicaudata (fat-tailed dunnart)
 Sminthopsis leucopus (white-footed dunnart)
 Sminthopsis murina (slender-tailed dunnart)
 Tachyglossus aculeatus (short-beaked echidna)
 Tadarida australis (white-striped free-tailed bat)
 Thylogale billardierii (Tasmanian pademelon)
 Trichosurus caninus (short-eared possum)
 Trichosurus vulpecula (common brushtail possum)
 Tursiops australis (burrunan dolphin)
 Tursiops truncatus (bottlenose dolphin)
 Vespadelus baverstocki (inland forest bat)
 Vespadelus darlingtoni (large forest bat)
 Vespadelus regulus (southern forest bat)
 Vespadelus vulturnus (little forest bat)
 Vombatus ursinus (common wombat)
 Vulpes vulpes (red fox) introduced
 Wallabia bicolor (swamp wallaby)
 Ziphius cavirostris (Cuvier's beaked whale)

References

 
Victoria
Mammals